The 1922 Campeonato de Portugal was the 1st edition of the Portuguese football knockout tournament, organized by the Portuguese Football Federation (FPF). The regional champions from the Algarve, Lisbon, Madeira, Porto FAs were invited to take part in this newly formed tournament. Due to organizational and financial problems, the Algarve and Madeira FAs could not participate and, thus, the competition only fixtured two teams: the Lisbon champions, Sporting CP; and the Porto champions, FC Porto. 

The winner of the inaugural Campeonato de Portugal was determined by a 'best-of-three' series. Porto won the first game 2–1 which was held at the Campo da Constituição. Sporting CP won the second match 2–0 which would force both sides to a third game where Porto won the game 3–1 to clinch the first Campeonato de Portugal.

Final

The 1922 Campeonato de Portugal Final was the final match of the 1922 Campeonato de Portugal, the 1st season of the Campeonato de Portugal, the Portuguese football knockout tournament, organized by the Portuguese Football Federation (FPF). Due to organizational and financial problems, the Algarve and Madeira FAs could not participate and, thus, the competition only fixtured two teams: Sporting CP, the Lisbon Champions, and FC Porto, the Porto champions.

The winner of the inaugural Campeonato de Portugal was determined by a 'best-of-three' series. After a 1–1 series tie, the third and final game took place at a neutral venue, the Campo do Bessa, where Porto defeated Sporting CP 3–1 to win the first Campeonato de Portugal.

First game

Second game

Third game

References

Campeonato de Portugal (1922–1938)
Port
1
FC Porto matches
Sporting CP matches